Dörtyol is a port city in Hatay Province, Turkey.

Dörtyol (literally "four roads") is a Turkish place name that may refer to the following places in Turkey:

 Dörtyol, Besni, a village in the district of Besni, Adıyaman Province
 Dörtyol, Şenkaya
 Dörtyol, Taşova, a village in the district of Taşova, Amasya Province